The year 1712 in architecture involved some significant events.

Buildings and structures

Buildings

 Castle Howard in Yorkshire, England (begun 1699), designed by Sir John Vanbrugh and Nicholas Hawksmoor, is completed.
 Roehampton House in Roehampton, London, England, designed by Thomas Archer is completed.
 Palais Trautson in Vienna is built.
 St Alkmund's Church, Whitchurch, Shropshire, England, designed by John Barker, is consecrated.
 Construction of church of Santissimo Nome di Maria e degli Angeli Custodi, Genoa, begins (completed c.1770).

Births
 November 7 – Antoine Choquet de Lindu, French architect and military engineer (died 1790)

Deaths
 October 27 – Sir William Robinson, English architect, worked in Ireland (born 1645)

References

architecture
Years in architecture
18th-century architecture